"One Thing" is a song by Canadian rock band Finger Eleven. It was released on September 8, 2003, as the second single from their self-titled third album (2003). The song reached number 16 on the US Billboard Hot 100 and entered the top 10 on three other Billboard charts. In Canada, the song reached number 28 on the Radio & Records CHR/Pop Top 30 airplay chart.

Release
The band had thought their single "Stay in Shadow" would become a popular hit, but strong success fell on "One Thing" instead, although the track didn't find wide mainstream attention until several months after its 2003 release. "One Thing" reached number 16 in the US and had exposure on TV series such as Smallville, Scrubs, Law & Order: Special Victims Unit and Third Watch.

Chart performance
This song hit number five on the Billboard Modern Rock Tracks chart and stayed there for 26 weeks. The song peaked at number two on the Adult Top 40 chart and found moderate success on the Adult Contemporary chart, peaking at number 23.

Music video
The song won the 2004 MuchMusic Video Award for Best Video. The music video features black-and-white footage of the band in a surreal nocturnal environment featuring a beach with a checkered pattern shore. A massive hourglass is seen on the checkered floor as well as band members perched on tall stands and leafless trees. Other imagery includes a crow, a woman standing over thousands of candles along a building floor, a symphony orchestra conductor conducting an empty orchestra, and a musical box with a spinning, lifelike ballerina. The "One Thing" video is featured on WWE's Cheating Death, Stealing Life: The Eddie Guerrero Story and Hard Knocks: The Chris Benoit Story DVDs as an extra.

Charts

Weekly charts

Year-end charts

Release history

References

2000s ballads
2003 singles
2003 songs
Black-and-white music videos
Finger Eleven songs
Rock ballads
Song recordings produced by Johnny K
Wind-up Records singles